Kathryn is a city in Barnes County, North Dakota, United States. The population was 66 at the 2020 census. Kathryn was founded in 1900. It was named after the daughter of a railroad man.

Geography
Kathryn is located at  (46.679373, -97.970202).

Demographics

2010 census
As of the census of 2010, there were 52 people, 30 households, and 12 families living in the city. The racial makeup of the city was 100.0% White.

There were 30 households, of which 13.3% had children under the age of 18 living with them, 30.0% were married couples living together, 10.0% had a male householder with no wife present, and 60.0% were non-families. 46.7% of all households were made up of individuals, and 36.7% had someone living alone who was 65 years of age or older. The average household size was 1.73 and the average family size was 2.42.

The median age in the city was 59.7 years. 13.5% of residents were under the age of 18; 3.7% were between the ages of 18 and 24; 15.4% were from 25 to 44; 23.1% were from 45 to 64; and 44.2% were 65 years of age or older. The gender makeup of the city was 40.4% male and 59.6% female.

2000 census
As of the census of 2000, there were 63 people, 29 households, and 18 families living in the city. The population density was 106.1 people per square mile (41.2/km2). There were 43 housing units at an average density of 72.4 per square mile (28.1/km2). The racial makeup of the city was 100.00% white.

There were 29 households, out of which 17.2% had children under the age of 18 living with them, 51.7% were married couples living together, 10.3% had a female householder with no husband present, and 34.5% were non-families. 31.0% of all households were made up of individuals, and 20.7% had someone living alone who was 65 years of age or older. The average household size was 2.17 and the average family size was 2.58.

In the city, the population was spread out, with 14.3% under the age of 18, 3.2% from 18 to 24, 28.6% from 25 to 44, 22.2% from 45 to 64, and 31.7% who were 65 years of age or older. The median age was 48 years. For every 100 females, there were 117.2 males. For every 100 females age 18 and over, there were 116.0 males.

The median income for a household in the city was $19,375, and the median income for a family was $40,625. Males had a median income of $30,625 versus $19,375 for females. The per capita income for the city was $15,618. There were 15.4% of families and 16.4% of the population living below the poverty line, including no under eighteens and 18.2% of those over 64.

References

External links
 Kathryn, North Dakota, 75th anniversary, 1900-1975 from the Digital Horizons website

Cities in Barnes County, North Dakota
Cities in North Dakota
Populated places established in 1900
1900 establishments in North Dakota